El Sharq  is an Egyptian opposition TV channel owned by Ayman Nour and is based in Istanbul, Turkey.

History

Programmes
 With Motaz (مع معتز).
 The Egyptian Street (الشارع المصرى).
 El Sharq Today (الشرق اليوم).
 Share (شير) .
 برنامج إيه الحكايه

Staff
 Moataz Matar
 Ahmed Atwan 
 Emad el behairy 
 Ahmed Samih 
 Doaa hassan

See also
 Mekameleen TV
 Egyptian revolution of 2011
 2013 Egyptian coup d'état

References

External links

Arabic-language television stations
Television in Egypt
Television stations in Egypt
2014 establishments in Turkey